Arhopala ammon, the Malayan oakblue, is a species of lycaenid or blue butterfly found in Southeast Asia (Assam to Burma, Langkawi, Peninsular Malaya, Singapore, Borneo).

References

Arhopala
Fauna of Pakistan
Butterflies of Singapore
Butterflies of Asia
Butterflies described in 1862
Taxa named by William Chapman Hewitson